Idrisovo (İźris) is a rural locality (a village) in Alkinsky Selsoviet, Salavatsky District, Bashkortostan, Russia. The population was 151 as of 2010. There are 6 streets.

Geography 
Idrisovo is located 21 km south of Maloyaz (the district's administrative centre) by road. Yunusovo is the nearest rural locality.

References 

Rural localities in Salavatsky District